Coleman Tech Charter High School (CTCHS) was a public charter high school in San Diego, California. It was under the jurisdiction of the San Diego Unified School District. As of 2017, the site of the school is utilized by The School for Entrepreneurship and Technology.

References

External links
Coleman Tech Charter High School website
San Diego Unified School District website

Charter high schools in California
High schools in San Diego